Shiqiao (Chinese: 市桥, pinyin: Shìqíao) is a Subdistrict of Panyu District, Guangzhou, Guangdong Province. It lies at the heart of Panyu, covers an area of 11.35 square km, and has a population of more than 280,000. Shiqiao is the political, economic, cultural and commercial centre of Panyu District, and has direct jurisdiction over 28 communities and 8 villages.

References

External links
 Official Website of Shiqiao Subdistrict

Panyu District
Township-level divisions of Guangdong